Slivovnik is a village in Vidin Province in northwestern Bulgaria. It is located in the municipality of Belogradchik.

Population
As of 2011, the village of Slivovnik has 18 inhabitants, down from its peak of 267 people shortly after the Second World War. The village is exclusively inhabited by ethnic Bulgarians (100%). Most inhabitants identify themselves as Christians, belonging to the Bulgarian Orthodox Church.

References

Villages in Vidin Province
Belogradchik Municipality